The Hesselbach Wind Farm (also known as Windpark Hesselbach) is North Rhine-Westphalia's first forest wind farm. It is situated in the forests of Bad Laasphe-Hesselbach. It consists of eight turbines, each with 3 megawatt (MW) capacity and was opened 2013.

Units

External links 

 energy agency NRW: Wind farm opened in Bad Laasphe to open up the forest for wind energy 
 RWE: Electricity from the woods 

Wind farms in Germany